The 1921–22 NCAA men's basketball season began in December 1921, progressed through the regular season and conference tournaments, and concluded in March 1922.

Rule changes
Running with the ball (traveling), previously a personal foul, became merely a violation.

Season headlines 

 The Southern Conference began play with 14 original members, 13 of which had major basketball programs during the 1921–22 season.
 The first national basketball championship tournament, the 1922 National Intercollegiate Basketball Tournament, took place in Indianapolis, Indiana, from March 9 to 11, 1922. The Eastern Intercollegiate Basketball League and Big Ten Conference declined invitations to participate, but six schools representing six other conferences took part. Wabash won and claimed the national championship. The tournament was not held again.
 In February 1943, the Helms Athletic Foundation retroactively selected Kansas as its national champion for the 1921–22 season.
 In 1995, the Premo-Porretta Power Poll retroactively selected Missouri as its national champion for the 1921–22 season.

Conference membership changes

NOTES: (1) The Southern Conference was founded in February 1921 during the 1920–21 season, but its first season of basketball competition was the 1921–22 season. (2) The University of Virginia did not adopt a nickname for its basketball team ("Cavaliers") until the 1923–24 season.

Regular season

Conference winners and tournaments 

NOTE: The Southern Intercollegiate men's basketball tournament included teams from both the Southern Conference and the Southern Intercollegiate Athletic Association. Although it was a regional rather than conference tournament whose champion claimed the mythical title of "Champions of the South," the Southern Conference considered it the "official" Southern Conference tournament for 1922.

Statistical leaders

Post-season tournament

National Intercollegiate Basketball Tournament

Semifinals & finals

Awards

Helms College Basketball All-Americans 

The practice of selecting a Consensus All-American Team did not begin until the 1928–29 season. The Helms Athletic Foundation later retroactively selected a list of All-Americans for the 1921–22 season.

Major player of the year awards 

 Helms Player of the Year: Chuck Carney, Illinois (retroactive selection in 1944)

Coaching changes 

A number of teams changed coaches during the season and after it ended.

References